The Diamond Hunters is a 1971 novel by Wilbur Smith.

Adaptation
Smith tried to get it made into a film for a number of years. It was adapted into the 1975 film The Kingfisher Caper and a 2001 television mini series.

References

External links
The Diamond Hunters (mini series) at IMDb

Novels by Wilbur Smith
1971 British novels
Heinemann (publisher) books
Novels set in Namibia
British novels adapted into films